21 Electronic Warfare Regiment is a Communications and Electronics Branch regiment in the Canadian Army, based in Kingston, Ontario. 21 EW Regt exists to provide trained army electronic warfare operators and support personnel to the Canadian Armed Forces. 214 Electronic Warfare Squadron is the only Reserve electronic warfare squadron within the Canadian Armed Forces that is a part of a Regular Force regiment. Many of its members serve in various UN and NATO peacekeeping missions around the world.

The regiment includes:

 212 Electronic Warfare Squadron (Regular)
 214 Electronic Warfare Squadron (Reserve)
 215 Electronic Warfare Squadron (Regular)
 218 Combat Service Support Squadron (Regular)
 Regimental Headquarters (Regular)

Occupations 
21 Electronic Warfare Regiment primarily employs the following occupations in the Canadian Army, among others:
 Signals Officer (00341 SIGS)
 Signals Intelligence Specialist (00120 SIGINT SPEC)
 Signal Operator (00362 SIG OP)
 Communication System Technician (00362-3 CST)
 Information System Technician (00394 IST)

References

External links

List of Signals Units
Canadian Forces Base Kingston
21 Electronic Warfare Official Website

Military communications regiments of Canada